Cezary Kulesza (born 22 June 1962) is a Polish former footballer and current president of the Polish Football Association (PZPN). He played for Jagiellonia Białystok in the Ekstraklasa. From 2010 to 2021 he served as a chairman of Jagiellonia Białystok.

References

External links
 

1962 births
Living people
Sportspeople from Białystok
Polish footballers
Association football midfielders
Ekstraklasa players
Hetman Białystok players
Jagiellonia Białystok players
Olimpia Zambrów players
Polish expatriate footballers
Polish expatriate sportspeople in Belgium
Expatriate footballers in Belgium